Santa Elisabetta delle Convertite is a formerly Roman Catholic church on Via de' Serragli in the Oltrarno neighborhood of Florence region of Tuscany, Italy. Since 2015, the church has functioned as a Georgian Orthodox church. The former adjacent convent has multiple uses, including in 2016 as the Istituti Pio X Artigianelli.

History
In 1332, a confraternity attached to the church of Santo Spirito founded an Augustinian monastery for repentant prostitutes at the site of an existing chapel dedicated to St Elizabeth of Hungary. It became one of the largest (in terms of population) but poorest communities of nuns in Florence. In 1624, the building incorporated the birth house of Saint Phillip Neri (born 1515). In 1808 the monastery was suppressed. It has had a number of subsequent uses since. The chapel is currently used by the Georgian Orthodox Church.

The church has a ceiling fresco depicting the Glory of St Maria Maddalena de' Pazzi by Alessandro Gherardini. While many of the church's famous works are now dispersed, such as Sandro Botticelli's Pala delle Convertite, it still contains Adoration of the Shepherds by Michele di Ridolfo del Ghirlandaio. The structure was restored by Giuseppe Castellucci in the 1900s, and again in the mid-1990s.

Works circa 1491-1493 by Sandro Botticelli once in the church
Now at Courtauld Gallery 
Pala delle Convertite 
Now at Philadelphia Museum of Art
Magdalen listens to Christ preaching
Feast in House of Simon
Noli me tangere
Communion and Assumption of the Magdalen

Sources
Sherill Cohen, The Evolution of Women's Asylums Since 1500: From Refuges for Ex-prostitutes to Shelters for Battered Women, 
Sharon Strocchia, Nuns and Nunneries of Renaissance Florence, 

Churches in Florence
Magdalene asylums
14th-century Roman Catholic church buildings in Italy